Pištín is a municipality and village in České Budějovice District in the South Bohemian Region of the Czech Republic. It has about 600 inhabitants.

Administrative parts
Villages of Češnovice, Pašice and Zálužice are administrative parts of Pištín.

Notable people
Marie Koupal Lusk (1862–1929), American painter

References

Villages in České Budějovice District